Ayeneh Varzan (also Romanized as Āyeneh Varzān; also known as ‘Eyn Varzān and ‘Ain-i-Varzān) is a village in Abarshiveh Rural District, in the Central District of Damavand County, Tehran Province, Iran. At the 2006 census, its population was 889, in 246 families.

References 

Populated places in Damavand County